Alpha Volantis (Alpha Vol), Latinized from α Volantis,  is a binary star system located in the southern constellation Volans. It has an apparent visual magnitude of +4.00, which is bright enough to be seen with the naked eye. Based upon parallax measurements made with the Hipparcos spacecraft, it is located at a distance of 125 light years from the Sun. As of 2010, the two components of this system had an angular separation of 0.0318″ along a position angle of 286.9°. The magnitude difference between the two components is 0.1. It is considered a member of the Sirius supercluster.

The primary component is an Am star with a stellar classification of kA3hA5mA5 V. This notation indicates the star has the weak calcium II K-line of an A3 star, and the hydrogen and metallic lines of an A5 star. It has an estimated age of 427 million years. In 1992, it was found to be emitting an infrared excess, suggesting the presence of a circumstellar disk of dust. However, subsequent observations have not confirmed this.

References

Volantis, Alpha
Volans (constellation)
A-type main-sequence stars
044382
3615
Gliese and GJ objects
Durchmusterung objects
078045
Binary stars
Am stars